Kenneth Simms (born August 4, 1986) is an American basketball player who played for Danang Dragons of the Vietnam Basketball Association (VBA).

Born in Bronx, New York, Simms has played for several clubs in Europe, South America and Asia since the start of his professional career in 2009.

Professional career
In 2010, Simms signed with CSM SCU Craiova in Romania, where he played until April. In the summer of 2010, he played for Ningxia Hanas in China.

Simms spent the following two seasons with Södertälje Kings of the Swedish Basketligan and the EuroChallenge. After a summer with Welcome in Uruguay, Simms signed with Belgian club Liège Basket for the 2013–14 season.

On July 12, 2014, Simms signed with SOMB, prior to being released before the start of the season. Affare getting cut, Simms signed with KTP-Basket of the Finnish Korisliiga. On October 9, 2015, he signed with Soles de Santo Domingo in the Dominican Republic. 

For the 2015–16 season, Simms signed with Pallacanestro Mantovana of the Serie A2 Basket, the Italian second-tier league. On April 7, 2016, he was named the MVP of Round 27 of the Serie A2, after recording 17 points and 17 rebounds.

After playing with Indios de San Francisco in the summer of 2016, Simms signed with Hungarian team Kaposvári KK. 

On August 8, 2017, Simms returned to KTP-Basket. In February, Simms was sent to Kataja Basket in a trade for Tim Williams. 

On April 23, 2018, Simms signed with Quimper, of the French second tier LNB Pro B.

On July 2, 2018, Simms signed with ZZ Leiden of the Dutch Basketball League (DBL). On March 31, he won the NBB Cup with Leiden.

References

1986 births
Living people
American expatriate basketball people in Belgium
American expatriate basketball people in the Dominican Republic
American expatriate basketball people in Finland
American expatriate basketball people in France
American expatriate basketball people in Italy
American expatriate basketball people in Japan
American expatriate basketball people in the Netherlands
American expatriate basketball people in Romania
American expatriate basketball people in Sweden
American expatriate basketball people in Uruguay
American men's basketball players
B.S. Leiden players
Centers (basketball)
Club Atlético Welcome basketball players
Cumberland Phoenix men's basketball players
FIU Panthers men's basketball players
Gunma Crane Thunders players
Jackson Memorial High School alumni
Kansas City Roos men's basketball players
Kaposvári KK players
Kataja BC players
KTP-Basket players
Liège Basket players
Pallacanestro Mantovana players
PS Karlsruhe Lions players
SCM U Craiova (basketball) players
Södertälje Kings players
Sportspeople from the Bronx
Basketball players from New York City
UJAP Quimper 29 players